1991 Australian Labor Party leadership spill may refer to:
*June 1991 Australian Labor Party leadership spill
December 1991 Australian Labor Party leadership spill